Kaisen Joki (January 2, 1500 – April 25, 1582) was a Buddhist priest from the Mino Province.

It is not known if he is related to the Toki clan. Following the rise to power of Saito Yoshitatsu, Joki fled to the Owari Province. From there he went to the Kai Province. There, Joki met Takeda Shingen and Shingen was very impressed by him. Shingen afterwards made Joki the head abbot of the Erin-ji in Kofu.

After the Oda–Tokugawa alliance invaded the territory of the Takeda in 1582, the Eirin-ji were accused of sheltering the likes of Rokkaku Yoshisuke (a former enemy of the Oda). This led to all the monks of the temple being burned to death. It is known that Joki was indeed very calm.

External links

Rinzai Buddhists
1500 births
1582 deaths
Deaths from fire in Japan